Ross Venus (born 28 April 1994) is an English professional ice hockey player currently playing for Coventry Blaze of the Elite Ice Hockey League (EIHL).

Venus represented Great Britain at the 2021 IIHF World Championship.

References

External links

1994 births
Living people
Coventry Blaze players
Milton Keynes Lightning players
English ice hockey left wingers
Telford Tigers players